The Micro Trend is a city car produced by Micro Cars Ltd. Sri Lanka. It was designed by Italy's Pininfarina and the Chinese company Hafei Motors. It was first introduced in January 2003 and sales began by April 2003.

External links
Official Web page from microcars.lk
Specifications

Economy of Sri Lanka
City cars
Cars introduced in 2003